This is a list of notable playwrights.
See also Literature; Drama; List of playwrights by nationality and date of birth; Lists of authors.

A

Ab–An

Ap–Ay

B

Ba–Be

Bi–By

C

D

E

F

G

H

I

J

K

L

M

N

O

P

Q

R

S

Sa–Se

Sg–Sr

St–Sz

T

U

Nicholas Udall (1504–1556, England)
Alfred Uhry (born 1936, United States)
Rodolfo Usigli (1905–1979, Mexico)

V

W

Y

Z

See also
List of Bosnian playwrights
List of British playwrights since 1950
List of Canadian playwrights
List of French playwrights
List of German playwrights
List of Irish dramatists
List of Jewish American playwrights
List of Slovenian playwrights
List of playwrights from the United States
List of early-modern British women playwrights